Arthur Bryant's is a restaurant located in Kansas City, Missouri. It is considered by some to be the most famous barbecue restaurant in the United States.

History

The restaurant's background was started by Henry Perry, the "father of Kansas City barbecue". In 1908, he had begun serving smoked meats from an alley stand to workers in the Garment District in Downtown Kansas City.  Perry moved to the 18th Street and Vine neighborhood where he sold barbecue for 25 cents per slab from a trolley barn at 19th and Highland.

Charlie Bryant was an employee there and was soon joined by his brother Arthur Bryant. In 1940 when Perry died, Charlie took over the restaurant. Arthur in turn took it over in 1946.

The restaurant was located for many years at 18th and Euclid Streets in the inner city neighborhood of 18th and Vine. Bryant moved the business to its present location, 1727 Brooklyn, in 1949. In the 1950s and through the early 1970s, it was visited by fans and players visiting Municipal Stadium, home to the Kansas City Athletics (1955–1967), Kansas City Chiefs (1963–1971) and Kansas City Royals (1969–1972). The stadium was located five blocks south of the restaurant until being razed in 1976.

The decor has consistently been formica tables, fluorescent lighting, and jugs of sauce placed in the windows. Its specialty is burnt ends, the flavorful end pieces of smoked beef brisket; burnt end sandwiches are served open-faced at the restaurant. Its sauce is characterized by vinegar and paprika rather than sweetness.

The restaurant gained fame over the next several decades, and notable diners include President Harry S. Truman. In 1974, it became the subject of international attention when Calvin Trillin wrote in Playboy that it was "possibly the single best restaurant in the world". Since then, it has been frequented by famous visitors, including area resident Tom Watson, Steven Spielberg, Harrison Ford, Bryant Gumbel, Jimmy Carter, Jack Nicholson, James Spader, Bill Clinton, Barack Obama, 2008 Republican presidential nominee John McCain and running mate Sarah Palin, and barbecue aficionados.

Arthur Bryant died in 1982, and the restaurant is now owned by Jerry Rauschelbach, who expanded the restaurant to the Kansas Speedway and Ameristar Casino. The location at Ameristar Casino closed in January 2014, after failing to make a new lease with the casino.

In 2022, the restaurant requested that customers refrain from ordering its popular brisket and burnt ends due to high beef prices.

See also
 List of barbecue restaurants
 Kansas City-style barbecue

References

Further reading

External links

Kansas City barbecue restaurants
The Kansas City Barbecue Society

Culture of Kansas City, Missouri
Barbecue restaurants in the United States
Restaurants in Kansas City, Missouri
Companies based in Kansas City, Missouri
Restaurants established in 1908
1908 establishments in Missouri